Ashby is a suburb of Scunthorpe in Lincolnshire, England. The population of the suburb is included in the Brumby ward of the North Lincolnshire Unitary Authority.

Education
Grange Lane Junior School is located under the shadow of the Corus steel works. It is a mixed school, that educates around 250 pupils aged 7–11, in an area of relative disadvantage. The Headteacher is Mrs I Thorpe and there is a total of 11 teachers and 11 teaching assistants.

Francis James (Frank) Goodenough, who died on 30 January 2005, was Headmaster for 21 years, between 1973 and 1994.

External links 
 

Populated places in Lincolnshire
Scunthorpe